The Multi-Platinum Debut Album is the first studio album by American hip hop group Hangar 18. It was released on Definitive Jux on June 15, 2004.

Critical reception
Rollie Pemberton of Stylus Magazine gave the album a grade of C, saying: "Somewhat of a backhanded recommendation, Hangar 18 may still be worthy of rotation at your next house party." Thomas Quinlan of Exclaim! said: "The title of their debut album may drip with sarcasm, but even if it may not go multi-platinum, Hangar 18 have an underground classic on their hands." Ryan Romana of XLR8R called it "a satisfying listen."

On July 7, 2004, Spin included it on the "More New Music to Hear Now" list.

Track listing

References

External links
 

2004 debut albums
Hangar 18 (band) albums
Definitive Jux albums